The Dames Point Light marked an  shoal at a sharp bend in the St. Johns River in Florida that was a danger to ships heading to or from Jacksonville.

History
In 1857 a small lightship was placed at the Dames Point shoal. The lightship was also equipped with a foghorn and bell. During the Civil War, the lightship was towed to Jacksonville, and all equipment was stored on shore. The ship did not survive the war, and the shoal remained unmarked until 1872.

On March 3, 1871 Congress appropriated $20,000 "for erecting an iron screw-pile lighthouse on the shoals off Dames Point, St. John's River in the State of Florida". During the winter of 1871-1872 the structure was framed at the workshop at Lazaretto Point, Maryland and the iron work prepared under contract. In March, 1872, a working party was dispatched to erect the structure which was completed in June, 1872.

The lighthouse stood on a shoal in 8 feet of water, being built on six wood piles, with cast iron sleeves, and had two fender-piles, one up and the other down stream. The fixed white light was first exhibited on July 15, 1872. In 1891 it was reported that the structure had been struck several times by lightning, and an additional lightning conductor of copper was provided in that year, to run from the lantern sill to one of the iron piles and thence below the lowest water line.

In 1893 the establishment of numerous post lights in the St. Johns River above and below the Dames Point Lighthouse made the continuance of the light unnecessary and it was discontinued February 28, 1893.  The lantern and lens were taken down and transferred to Charleston, South Carolina and the lantern parapet was roofed in with shingles. The remaining lighthouse structure was destroyed by fire on December 25, 1913.

The Dames Point Light was located close to the present-day north bridge pier of the Dames Point Bridge that crosses the St. Johns River.

See also

 List of lighthouses in Florida
 List of lighthouses in the United States

References

Florida Lighthouse Page - Dames Point Lightship and Lighthouse History - accessed June 29, 2008

Lighthouses completed in 1872
Lighthouses in Florida
1872 establishments in Florida
1893 disestablishments in Florida
1913 fires in the United States
Buildings and structures demolished in 1913